Atagema molesta is a species of sea slug or dorid nudibranch, a marine gastropod mollusc in the family Discodorididae.

Distribution
This species was described from the intertidal zone at Te Hāwere-a-Maki / Goat Island, Leigh, New Zealand.

References

Discodorididae
Gastropods described in 1989